Tim Ehrhardt (born March 16, 1995) is an American athlete specializing in decathlon and pole vault.

High school
Ehrhardt graduated from Lake Park High School in 2013 in Roselle, Illinois.

NCAA 
Ehrhardt graduated from Michigan State University.

Ehrhardt is a 6-time NCAA Division I First Team All-American, a former resident of Whitehills, and a 3-time Big Ten Conference Track and field champion. Ehrhardt holds Michigan State Spartans records in the indoor pole vault  and decathlon 8,044 points.

Professional
Ehrhardt began competing for Santa Barbara Track Club in Santa Barbara, California under coach Josh Priester in Fall 2018.

Ehrhardt placed third at 2019 Bryan Clay Invitational Decathlon 4th group at Azusa Pacific University setting a lifetime best mark scoring 8066 points.

References

External links
 
 
 
 Tim Ehrhardt podcast after 2019 US Indoor Track and Field Heptathlon

1995 births
Living people
Sportspeople from Chicago
Track and field athletes from Illinois
American male pole vaulters
Michigan State Spartans men's track and field athletes
People from DuPage County, Illinois
USA Indoor Track and Field Championships winners